Luisa Fernanda Rudi Úbeda (born 14 December 1950) is a Spanish politician currently serving as Senator from Aragón since 2015. She served as the 175th president of the Congress of Deputies, being the first woman to hold the position in Spanish history. From 2011 to 2015 she served as president of the Government of Aragon.

Rudi was born in Seville. In the Spanish parliament she represented Zaragoza from 1986–1996 and from 2000 to 2004. She was a substitute for Committee on Industry, Research and Energy, substitute for the Delegation to the EU-Mexico Joint Parliamentary Committee.

She was a member of the Bureau of the European People's Party and sat on the European Parliament's Committee on the Internal Market and Consumer Protection.

Between July 2011 and July 2015 she was President of the Government of Aragon. Since 2015 is member of the Senate of Spain.

External links
 
 

|-

1950 births
Living people
20th-century Spanish women politicians
Members of the Cortes of Aragon
Members of the 3rd Congress of Deputies (Spain)
Members of the 4th Congress of Deputies (Spain)
Members of the 5th Congress of Deputies (Spain)
Members of the 7th Congress of Deputies (Spain)
Members of the 8th Congress of Deputies (Spain)
Members of the 9th Congress of Deputies (Spain)
Members of the 10th Senate of Spain
Members of the 11th Senate of Spain
Members of the 12th Senate of Spain
Members of the 13th Senate of Spain
Members of the 14th Senate of Spain
MEPs for Spain 2004–2009
21st-century women MEPs for Spain
Municipal councillors in the province of Zaragoza
People from Seville
People's Party (Spain) MEPs
Presidents of the Congress of Deputies (Spain)
Presidents of the Government of Aragon
Women legislative speakers
Women mayors of places in Spain
Women presidents of the autonomous communities of Spain
Mayors of Zaragoza